Tsarskoye Selo ("Tsar's Village") was the town containing a former residence of the Russian imperial family and visiting nobility, located  south from the center of Saint Petersburg. The residence now forms part of the town of Pushkin. Tsarskoye Selo forms one of the World Heritage Site Saint Petersburg and Related Groups of Monuments.

The town bore the name Tsarskoye Selo until 1918, Detskoe Selo in the years 1918–1937, then Pushkin from 1937 onwards.

History

The area of Tsarskoye Selo, once part of Swedish Ingria, first became a Russian royal/imperial residence in the early 18th century as an estate of the Empress-consort Catherine (later Empress-regnant as Catherine I), from whom the Catherine Palace takes its name. The Alexander Palace (built from 1792 onwards) originated as the home of Catherine the Great's grandson, the Grand Duke Alexander Pavlovich, who later became Emperor Alexander I.  After his abdication, Nicholas II and his family, were under house arrest here until 13 August 1917.

The Royal Forestry School, perhaps the first such school in Russia, was founded in Tsarskoye Selo in 1803; it was moved to Saint Petersburg in 1811, to become the Imperial Forestry Institute.

According to Robert K. Massie, "Tsarskoe Selo was a magnificent symbol, a supreme gesture, of the Russian autocracy. At the edge of the great St. Petersburg plain, fifteen miles south of the capital, a succession of Russian tsars and empresses had created an isolated, miniature world, as artificial and fantastic as a precisely ordered mechanical toy. Inside the park, monuments, obelisks and triumphal arches studded eight hundred acres of velvet green lawn. An artificial lake, big enough for small sailboats, could be emptied and filled like a bathtub. At one end of the lake stood a pink Turkish bath; not far off, a dazzling red-and-gold Chinese pagoda crowned an artificial hillock." The two palaces stood five hundred yards apart in the Imperial Park. "Outside the palace gates, Tsarskoe Selo, was an elegant provincial town..." The town included "The mansions of the aristocracy, lining the wide tree-shaded boulevard which led from the railway station to the gates of the Imperial Park..."

Nickname for elite Soviet neighborhoods
In the Soviet Union the nickname "the Tsar's village" came to apply to blocks and small neighborhoods that housed the nomenklatura (Soviet elites).  Their stores were better stocked,  although they were still affected by Soviet-era shortages. The buildings in the neighborhoods were better designed, constructed and maintained.
One such neighborhood, west of Moscow, contained less industry and more parks than any other neighborhood.

Monuments

 Alexander Palace and associated park
 Catherine Palace and associated park
Amber Room
Kagul Obelisk
 Sophia Cathedral
 Tsarskoye Selo Lyceum

Gallery

See also
Treaty of Tsarskoye Selo
Emperor railway station in Pushkin town
Adolphe Kegresse

References

Further reading

External links

Tsarskoye Selo, Pushkin town, historical facts of the city, map, local weather, directions from St. Petersburg
The State Museum of Tsarskoye Selo 
Alexander Palace Time Machine The Alexander Palace Time Machine
Tsarskoye Selo in 1910 – a guide to the Palaces, Park and Town
Photo Tours of Tsarskoye Selo
Last Days at Tsarskoe Selo Last Days at Tsarskoye Selo by Count Paul Beckendorff
Photographic views of Tsarskoye Selo, c. 2002  The Nostalgic Glass
Tsarskoye Selo Photos Iconicarchive Gallery
Bernard DeCou's colored photos of Tsarskoye Selo, c. 1931

 
Palaces in Russia
Gardens in Russia
Royal residences in Russia
World Heritage Sites in Russia
Charles Cameron buildings
History of forestry education
Forestry in Russia
1905 Russian Revolution
Saint-Petersburg State Forestry University